George Ulises Corral Ang (born 18 July 1990) is a Mexican professional footballer who plays as a defender for Liga MX club Puebla.

George Corral is the brother of female footballer Charlyn Corral.

International career
On 15 April 2015, Corral made his senior national team debut in a friendly against the United States.

Honours
Querétaro
Copa MX: Apertura 2016

References

External links

1990 births
Living people
Liga MX players
Club América footballers
People from Ecatepec de Morelos
Footballers from the State of Mexico
Chiapas F.C. footballers
Querétaro F.C. footballers
Association football fullbacks
Mexico international footballers
2015 Copa América players
Mexican footballers